William Johnston Hogg (September 11, 1881 – December 8, 1909), nicknamed "Buffalo Bill", was a right-handed pitcher in Major League Baseball. He played four seasons with the New York Highlanders from 1905 to 1908.

Born in Port Huron, Michigan, Hogg played in 116 Major League games and had a record of 37–50 in 730 innings pitched.

During his second season in baseball (1902), as a member of the Seattle Clamdiggers, Hogg was suspended from the team for attacking a newspaper reporter. According to The Oregonian in 1903 Hogg was a "trouble-maker" and "his love for drink would not be kept under control, and it was not long until he was mixed up in a street fight, in which he was stabbed".

In 1906, Hogg hit Cleveland Naps player Bill Bradley with a pitch, fracturing Bradley's arm, and was quoted as saying: "That big Frenchman (Nap Lajoie) is next on my list." Hogg was once almost traded from the Highlanders to the Detroit Tigers for Ty Cobb in 1907, according to Cobb's biography written by Al Stump. The deal was nixed at the last minute by Tigers president Bill Yawkey.

Hogg died in 1909 at age 28 in New Orleans, Louisiana.

References

External links

BaseballLibrary.com

1881 births
1909 deaths
Major League Baseball pitchers
New York Highlanders players
Baseball players from Michigan
Pueblo Indians players
Seattle Clamdiggers players
Portland Browns players
Seattle Chinooks players
Spokane Indians players
Seattle Siwashes players
Louisville Colonels (minor league) players
People from Port Huron, Michigan
Sportspeople from Metro Detroit